Metizolam (also known as desmethyletizolam) is a thienotriazolodiazepine that is the demethylated analogue of the closely related etizolam.

Legal status 
Following its sale as a designer drug, metizolam was classified as controlled substance in Sweden on 26. January 2016.

See also 
 List of benzodiazepine designer drugs

References 

Chloroarenes
Designer drugs
GABAA receptor positive allosteric modulators
Hypnotics
Thienotriazolodiazepines